Martins Ferry is the largest city in Belmont County, Ohio, United States, along the Ohio River across from Wheeling, West Virginia. The population was 6,260 as of the 2020 census. It is part of the Wheeling metropolitan area.

History

Martins Ferry is the oldest European settlement in the state of Ohio, having been settled at least as early as 1779, almost a decade before Marietta. The settlement got its start as a consequence of a land grant to George Mercer of the Ohio Company in 1748 from the British Crown for 200,000 acres in the Ohio Country, a colloquial term for what is now much of Ohio, and western West Virginia and Pennsylvania. The grant called for among other things, establishment of a fort. The grant was for land south of the Ohio River in West Virginia (then Virginia). Settlement was hampered by the outbreak of the French and Indian War. The settlement was named Zanesburg (renamed Wheeling in 1795). The Ohio Company was dissolved in 1779, and claims issued by the Crown became moot after the Revolutionary War. The community across the river was a westward extension of Zanesburg, but at that time, settlement on the west bank of the Ohio River was prohibited by the Treaty of Fort Stanwix, 1768. Through the years, it has been known as Hoglinstown, Mercertown, Norristown (1785), Jefferson (1795), Martinsville (1835), and Martin's Ferry (1865). 

Squatters from across the Ohio were the earliest settlers. The settlement formed in the shadow of Virginia's Fort Fincastle, later renamed Fort Henry on the Virginia side of the Ohio, built in 1774. The town was disbanded a couple of times before becoming established as Norristown in 1785. In 1795, the town of Jefferson was platted by Absalom Martin, one of the city's earliest settlers, who operated a ferry there. In 1801, he abandoned his plat when St. Clairsville was selected as the county seat of the newly organized county of Belmont, one of the founding territories of the Northwest Territory.  

In 1835, Ebenezer Martin, the son of Absalom Martin, redesigned the town, which he called "Martinsville", with a grid system of streets, much of which survives to this day. Martinsville remained an unincorporated settlement for a relatively long time. It was eventually incorporated as a village in 1865 and renamed Martin's Ferry for Ebenezer's father's ferry. It was chartered as a city in 1885, and sometime later the apostrophe was dropped from the city's name. 

The city developed as an important industrial center during the late 19th century and early 20th century. It became an important rail hub and river port. Over the past 50 years, the town's population has decreased significantly as industries have closed or moved elsewhere. Today, the city's population is less than half of what it once was.

Geography
Martins Ferry is at  (40.099122, -80.725154).

The town is built on two basic plateaus between a hill and the Ohio River. The lower plateau, along the river, is dominated by a large industrial park, the Martins Ferry Football Stadium, and Ohio State Route 7 (a four-lane traffic artery that runs from north to south across eastern Ohio). The higher plateau, which is the larger of the two, is predominantly residential and commercial, and is home to most of the city's residents. It gradually rises to a steep hillside in the west that forms a natural wall.

Directly across the river lies the city of Wheeling, West Virginia, and to the east is the Pennsylvania state line. On the southern end of town, Martins Ferry is directly connected to the village of Bridgeport.

Demographics

2010 census
As of the census of 2010, there were 6,915 people, 3,022 households, and 1,787 families residing in the city. The racial makeup of the city was 91.6% White, 5.6% African American, 0.3% Native American, 0.1% Asian, 0.2% from other races, and 2.2% from two or more races. Hispanic or Latino of any race 0.7% of the population.

There were 3,022 households, of which 27.3% had children under the age of 18 living with them, 38.2% were married couples living together, 16.1% had a female householder with no husband present, 4.9% had a male householder with no wife present, and 40.9% were non-families. 35.3% of all households were made up of individuals, and 15% had someone living alone who was 65 years of age or older. The average household size was 2.26 and the average family size was 2.89.

The median age in the city was 42.1 years. 21.3% of residents were under the age of 18; 9.2% were between the ages of 18 and 24; 23.5% were from 25 to 44; 28.9% were from 45 to 64; and 17.2% were 65 years of age or older. The gender makeup of the city was 46.8% male and 53.2% female.

2000 census
During the census of 2000, there were 7,226 people, 3,202 households, and 1,959 families residing in the city. The population density was 3,345.1 people per square mile (1,291.7/km2). There were 3,680 housing units at an average density of 1,703.6 per square mile (657.8/km2). The racial makeup of the city was 93.19% White, 5.11% African American, 0.30% Native American, 0.04% Asian, 0.03% Pacific Islander, 0.22% from other races, and 1.11% from two or more races. Hispanic or Latino of any race were 0.64% of the population.

There were 3,202 households, out of which 26.5% had children under the age of 18 living with them, 42.2% were married couples living together, 15.5% had a female householder with no husband present, and 38.8% were non-families. 35.2% of all households were made up of individuals, and 19.1% had someone living alone who was 65 years of age or older. The average household size was 2.24 and the average family size was 2.86.

In the city, the population was spread out, with 22.4% under the age of 18, 7.2% from 18 to 24, 25.9% from 25 to 44, 24.1% from 45 to 64, and 20.3% who were 65 years of age or older. The median age was 41 years. For every 100 females, there were 84.1 males. For every 100 females age 18 and over, there were 78.5 males.

The median income for a household in the city was $23,960, and the median income for a family was $32,365. Males had a median income of $30,486 versus $21,979 for females. The per capita income for the city was $16,672. About 16.1% of families and 18.3% of the population were below the poverty line, including 28.6% of those under age 18 and 9.9% of those age 65 or over.

Education
The children of Martins Ferry are educated by the Martins Ferry City School District. Martins Ferry High School is located in and serves the city. In addition to the public school system, Martins Ferry is also served by two religious schools: St Mary's Catholic School and the Martins Ferry Christian School.

Martins Ferry has a public library, a branch of the Belmont County District Library.

Community
There are 14 churches providing places of worship for Catholics, Baptists, Methodists, Nazarenes, Pentecostals, Presbyterians, Lutherans, Greek Orthodox Christians, Episcopalians and non-denominational Christians. There are also a number of clubs and organizations for veterans, ethnic groups and senior citizens.

The city has multiple cemeteries, including Riverview Cemetery, St. Mary's Catholic Cemetery and Walnut Grove Pioneer Cemetery. The latter is the burial place of local heroine, Betty Zane, who saved Fort Henry in Wheeling during one of the last battles of the American Revolutionary War by hiding gunpowder inside her dress. Her brother, Ebenezer Zane, who cut Zane's Trace from Wheeling to Maysville, Kentucky, opening the west for settlement, is also buried in Walnut Grove Pioneer Cemetery, along with Absalom and Ebenezer Martin and other important early settlers.

Events
The volunteer fire department celebrates Betty Zane Frontier Days annually, in honor of American Revolutionary War participant Betty Zane.

In early spring, the city holds a Soap Box Derby.

Climate
The climate in this area is characterized by hot, humid summers and dry, cold winter temperatures. According to the Köppen Climate Classification system, Martins Ferry has a Humid continental climate.

In popular culture
 James Wright wrote Autumn Begins in Martins Ferry, Ohio. The James Wright Poetry Festival was held in Martins Ferry from 1981 to 2007.

Notable people
Joe DeNardo, Pittsburgh meteorologist
Alex Groza, 1948 Summer Olympics gold medalist and star basketball player
Lou Groza, Pro Football Hall of Fame kicker and offensive lineman with Cleveland Browns and Ohio State Buckeyes
John Havlicek, Hall of Fame basketball player for Ohio State and Boston Celtics
Cecil Hobbs, scholar of Southeast Asian history
William Dean Howells, realist author
Johnny Lipon, Major League Baseball infielder and Cleveland Indians manager
Dan McGrew, professional football player (center) for Buffalo Bills
Robert E. Murray, mining engineer and businessman
Joe Niekro, Major League Baseball pitcher
Phil Niekro, Major League Baseball pitcher inducted into Baseball Hall of Fame in 1997
Tim Spencer, NFL and USFL football player, Tampa Bay Buccaneers running backs coach
Charlie Wilson, politician who served as member of the U.S. House and Ohio General Assembly
Jason Wilson, politician and former member of the Ohio Senate
James Wright, Pulitzer Prize-winning poet and author

See also
List of cities and towns along the Ohio River

References

External links

Martins Ferry Public Library

Cities in Ohio
Cities in Belmont County, Ohio
Populated places established in 1779
Ohio populated places on the Ohio River
1779 establishments in the United States